Jagged Alliance: Flashback is a turn-based tactics video game developed and published by Full Control for the PC in October 2014. It is part of the Jagged Alliance series.

Gameplay
Jagged Alliance: Flashback is a turn-based tactics game. The game takes place during a revolt on the fictional Caribbean island San Hermanos in the 1980s. The player takes control of a team of mercenaries to try to depose the forces of "The Prince", the king of San Hermanos. The player can design their mercenary in a character creator. The game is in real-time until enemy is sighted when the game changes to turn-based mode. Action points are used for movement and shooting. Guns can be aimed at different body parts.

Release
Jagged Alliance: Flashback was developed by Full Control, a studio based in Copenhagen, Denmark. It was announced on April 11, 2013 that Full Control had signed with bitComposer to develop the next installment in the Jagged Alliance series. On April 23, 2013, Full Control launched a Kickstarter campaign for the game, that was now called Jagged Alliance: Flashback. The Kickstarter campaign was funded on May 23, 2013. A closed alpha version was released for Kickstarter backers in April 2014. The game was released on Steam's early access on May 16, 2014. The full version was released on October 21, 2014 for Windows, Linux, and macOS.

Reception

Jagged Alliance: Flashback received "mixed or average" reviews according to review aggregator Metacritic.

Davide Pessach of Eurogamer said: "It doesn't stand up to the series' quality, and the dedicated community of modders can't salvage very much since the game is flawed in its core mechanics."

Marcel Kleffmann of 4Players said: "Everything is reduced to the absolute minimum: character development, story, presentation. Luckily the tense turn-based firefights work well enough to save the game. Nonetheless you’re better off with Wasteland 2."

Grzegorz Bobrek of Gry-Online said: "Jagged Alliance: Flashback looked poor and chaotic just a few months before its debut. The final version looks just as bad. The developers work will get no enthusiasm from gamers. A year and a half ago Full Control studio has asked fans for support on Kickstarter and now they need to explain themselves and fix a very poorly made game."

Miikka Lehtonen of Pelaaja summarized: "As it stands, the game is by no means worth its price tag, and vague talks about future plans will not change the situation. Get Jagged Alliance 2 instead, it's still ten times better."

Softpedia awarded the game with the "Biggest Disappointment of 2014".

References

External links

2014 video games
Early access video games
Full Control games
Flashback
Kickstarter-funded video games
Linux games
MacOS games
Single-player video games
Turn-based tactics video games
Video games developed in Denmark
Video games set in the 1980s
Video games set in the Caribbean
Video games set on islands
Video games with Steam Workshop support
Windows games